The enzyme 2-deoxyglucose-6-phosphatase (EC 3.1.3.68) catalyzes the reaction

2-deoxy-D-glucose 6-phosphate + H2O  2-deoxy-D-glucose + phosphate

This enzyme belongs to the family of hydrolases, specifically those acting on phosphoric monoester bonds.  The systematic name is 2-deoxy-D-glucose-6-phosphate phosphohydrolase. This enzyme is also called 2-deoxyglucose-6-phosphate phosphatase.

References

 
 

EC 3.1.3
Enzymes of unknown structure